is a junction railway station located in the city of  Tome, Miyagi Prefecture, Japan operated by the East Japan Railway Company (JR East) . Since the 2011 tsunami, the station has become the de facto terminal station of the Kesennuma Line, with services beyond the station replaced by a provisional bus rapid transit line.

Lines
Yanaizu Station is served by the Kesennuma Line, and is located 17.6 rail kilometers from the terminus of the line at Maeyachi Station.

Station layout
Yanaizu Station has a single island platform connected to the station building by a footbridge. The station is staffed.

Platforms

History
Yanaizu Station opened on October 24, 1968. The station was absorbed into the JR East network upon the privatization of the Japan National Railways (JNR) on April 1, 1987. Since the 2011 tsunami, the station has become the de facto terminal station of the Kesennuma Line, with services beyond the station replaced by a bus rapid transit line.

Passenger statistics
In fiscal 2018, the station was used by an average of 43 passengers daily (boarding passengers only).

Surrounding area

Yanaizu Post Office

See also
 List of Railway Stations in Japan

References

External links

   
  video of a train trip from Rikuzen-Yokoyama Station to Yanaizu Station in 2009.
  video of a train trip from Yanaizu Station to Rikuzen-Toyosato Station in 2009, passing Mitakedō Station at around 03:35 minutes without stopping.

Railway stations in Miyagi Prefecture
Kesennuma Line
Railway stations in Japan opened in 1968
Tome, Miyagi
Stations of East Japan Railway Company